Ângelo Ricardo Versari (born April 27, 1984, in Campo Mourão), or simply Ângelo, is a Brazilian right wingback who plays for Joinville Esporte Clube.

External links

1984 births
Living people
Brazilian footballers
Club Athletico Paranaense players
Paraná Clube players
Cruzeiro Esporte Clube players
Sport Club Internacional players
Al Sadd SC players
Joinville Esporte Clube players
Brazilian expatriate footballers
Qatar Stars League players
Expatriate footballers in Qatar
Brazilian expatriate sportspeople in Qatar
Association football defenders